Edward Mulhare (8 April 1923 – 24 May 1997) was an Irish actor whose career spanned five decades. He is best known for his starring roles in two television series: The Ghost & Mrs. Muir and Knight Rider.

Early life and career
Mulhare, one of three brothers, was born at 22 Quaker Road, Cork City, County Cork, Ireland, to John and Catherine (née Keane) Mulhare. As a child, he received his education at St. Nessan's Christian Brothers School, and later North Monastery. Mulhare, as a young adult, began schooling at the National University of Ireland in medicine, but eventually decided upon a career in theatre. After acting in various Irish venues including the Gate Theatre in Dublin, he moved to London, where he worked with Orson Welles and John Gielgud. He co-starred with Orson Welles in a 1951 production of "Othello" directed by Laurence Olivier, and played in Pygmalion before going to America.

In 1955 Mulhare starred as James Finnegan in the first feature film produced in Israel – Hill 24 Doesn't Answer.

His best-known stage role was as Professor Higgins in the original Broadway production of My Fair Lady, having taken over the role from Rex Harrison in 1957. Mulhare was understudy to Harrison until that time, going on to play the part for three years in New York for 1000 performances, then continuing the role on an international tour, which included an extensive tour of Russia. He continued to perform the role in summer theatres and for touring companies into the 1970s. A notable East Lansing MI university campus performance of My Fair Lady was originally canceled due to blizzard, but played to a packed house of 4000 when word was sent out that any student could get into the performance free, if they could get there. Many showed up on skis; as told by Mulhare and Anne Rogers on The Irv Kupcinet Show in a 1978 interview. Mulhare and Rogers continued their acting partnership, playing King Arthur and Guenevere in Camelot.

Television
His first television appearance was in 1956 in a production of The Adventures of Robin Hood. He was a guest panelist in 1958, and again in 1963, on the CBS television game show What's My Line? By 1965, he was back in Hollywood appearing in films and television shows. He earned a role in the films Von Ryan's Express in 1965, Our Man Flint in 1966, and Caprice in 1967. He guest-starred in television programs, including the Twelve O'Clock High episode "Siren Voices" as Luftwaffe Colonel Kurt Halland. In The Ghost & Mrs. Muir, a supernatural sitcom that ran from 1968 to 1970, he starred as Captain Daniel Gregg, and again was something of a successor to Rex Harrison, who had originated the role of "The Ghost" in the original 1947 film.

In 1969 Mulhare starred in Gidget Grows Up, an American made-for-television comedy film with Karen Valentine in the title role. He plays Alex Mac Laughlin, a love interest for Gidget. Harlan Carraher, who played Jonathan Muir in The Ghost and Mrs Muir with Edward, has a small part as well.

He also guest-starred in "Experiment In Terra", an episode of the original Battlestar Galactica.

Mulhare co-starred as Devon Miles, director of the Foundation for Law and Government, on Knight Rider (1982–1986), alongside David Hasselhoff's Michael Knight.

In the mid-1980s, Mulhare hosted the television series Secrets & Mysteries, also called Secrets of the Unknown, a magazine show that examined historical mysteries and the paranormal.

Later years
He starred in a number of films in his career including Megaforce and Out to Sea. His final role was on Baywatch Nights alongside former Knight Rider co-star David Hasselhoff in December 1996.

Death
A heavy smoker, he died of lung cancer on 24 May 1997, aged 74, at his home in Van Nuys, California. He had been battling the cancer for five months prior to his death. Team Knight Rider dedicated an episode titled "K.R.O.", to Mulhare's memory (broadcast 27 October 1997). According to the annual magazine, Who's Who in TV, 1968-1969 Mulhare was "a real ladies' man"; however, he remained a lifelong bachelor. He is buried in St. Joseph's Cemetery, Tory Top Road, Cork City, Ireland.

Filmography

Captain Boycott (1947) .... Foster's Secretary (uncredited)
Giv'a 24 Eina Ona (1955) .... James Finnegan
The Adventures of Robin Hood .... (1956) .... Various
The Outer Limits (ABC-TV): "The Sixth Finger" (1963) .... Professor of Genetics
Mr. Novak (NBC-TV, 1963): "He Who Can Does" .... Rand Hardy 
Signpost to Murder (1964) .... Dr. Mark Fleming
Daniel Boone (1964 TV series) - Admiral Lord Clydesdale - S1/E23 "The Ben Franklin Encounter" (1965)
Von Ryan's Express (1965) .... Captain Costanzo
Daniel Boone (1964 TV series) - Col. Worthing - S2/E1 "Empire of the Lost" (1965)
Our Man Flint (1966) .... Malcolm Rodney
Caprice (1967) .... Sir Jason Fox
Eye of the Devil (1967) .... Jean-Claude Ibert
The Ghost & Mrs. Muir (1968) TV Series .... Capt. Daniel Gregg
Gidget Grows Up (1969) (TV) .... Alex MacLaughlin
The Streets of San Francisco  (ABC-TV series season 1 episode 5) Tower Beyond Tragedy (1972).... Amory Gilliam, (season 3 episode 6) One Chance To Live (1974).... Brian Downing
Ellery Queen (1976) (TV) (Season 1, episode 19 "Adventure of the Two-Faced Woman").... Myles Prescott
Hunter (1977) (TV series)...Season 1, Episode 1 "Bluebird is Back"
Battlestar Galactica (1979) (TV) .... Season 1, Episode 22 "Experiment In Terra"
Hart to Hart (1979) (TV) .... Season 1, Episode 12 "The Man with Jade Eyes"
Megaforce (1982) .... General Edward Byrne-White
Knight Rider (1982) TV Series .... Devon Miles
Murder, She Wrote (1986)  TV Series .... Season 2, Episode 17 "One Good Bid Deserves A Murder" ....Season 3, Episode 10 "Stage Struck"
MacGyver (1986) TV series, Season 2.... Guy Roberts
B-17: The Flying Fortress (1987) (voice) .... Narrator
Secrets & Mysteries (1988) TV series .... Host
Knight Rider 2000 (1991) .... Devon Miles
Spider-Man: The Animated Series" (1994) TV Series (Voice) .... Spencer Smythe Season 1 Episode 2 "The Spider Slayer"Hart to Hart: Secrets of the Hart (1995) (TV)Baywatch Nights (1997) .... Dr. Lancaster (1 episode)Out to Sea'' (1997) .... Cullen Carswell (final film role)

References

External links

 
 
 
 

1923 births
1997 deaths
Deaths from lung cancer in California
Irish male film actors
Irish male musical theatre actors
Irish male stage actors
Irish male television actors
Irish expatriates in the United States
Male actors from Cork (city)
20th-century American male actors
20th-century Irish male actors
20th-century Irish male singers
People educated at North Monastery